The Forbes's miner bee (Andrena forbesii) is a species of miner bee in the family Andrenidae. Another common name for this species is the Forbes' andrena. It is found in North America.

References

Further reading

External links

 

forbesii
Articles created by Qbugbot
Insects described in 1891